Megaoryzomys curioi, also known as the Galápagos giant rat, is an extinct species of sigmodontine rodent, known only from Santa Cruz Island in the Galápagos Islands. It likely met its demise when European settlers introduced invasive species to the island. It is the only species in the genus Megaoryzomys. Its relationships have historically been unclear; it has been placed in both Oryzomyini and Thomasomyini in the past. A 2020 study favoured placing it in the former on overall skull morphology.

References

Sigmodontinae
Mammals described in 1979
Endemic fauna of the Galápagos Islands
Monotypic rodent genera